The Haibao Pagoda Temple is a Buddhist temple located in Xingqing District of Yinchuan, Ningxia, China. Because of earthquakes, the modern temple was founded in the 18th century in the period of the Qianlong Emperor (1736–1796) during the mid-Qing dynasty (1644–1911). It is the headquarters of the Buddhist Association of Ningxia.

History
The temple was first constructed in the early 5th century, during the Northern and Southern dynasties (420–581). The temple is named after the Haibao Pagoda, also known as "Hebao Pagoda" and "Heibao Pagoda". According to the local county annals, the pagoda was restored by Helian Bobo (381–425) and the Emperor Wulie of Xia Kingdom (407–431).

The temple had been subjected to two earthquakes in 1712 and 1778, during the mid-Qing dynasty (618–907).

In the early Republic period (1912–1949), it was called "Haibao Chan Temple".

In March 1961, it was listed among the "Major National Historical and Cultural Sites in Ningxia" by the State Council of China.  

In October 1963, the then Vice-President Dong Biwu visited the temple. In the 1960s, Deng Xiaoping visited the temple.

In 1983, the temple was categorized as a National Key Buddhist Temple in Han Chinese Area by the State Council of China.

Architecture
The entire complex faces the west and has an exquisite layout in the order of the Hall of Shanmen, Hall of Four Heavenly Kings, Mahavira Hall, Hall of Skanda, and Hall of Jade Buddha.

Hall of Shanmen
The Hall of Shanmen is a gable and hip roof building. Under the eaves is a plaque with the Chinese characters "" written by Zhao Puchu, the then president of the Buddhist Association of China.

Mahavira Hall
The Mahavira Hall in the main hall in the temple which houses the statues of the Three-Life Buddha. The statues of Eighteen Arhats are enshrined on the left and right side of the hall.

Hall of Jade Buddha
The Hall of Jade Buddha is the hall where the statue of Shakyamuni is enshrined. The statue was carved in the Burmese style. The  statue is made of jade.

Haibao Pagoda
It is composed of a pagoda base, a dense-eave body, and a thatsa.

References

Buddhist temples in Ningxia
Buildings and structures in Yinchuan
Tourist attractions in Yinchuan
5th-century establishments in China
5th-century Buddhist temples
18th-century establishments in China
18th-century Buddhist temples
Major National Historical and Cultural Sites in Ningxia